Churchill's People is a series of 26 historical dramas produced by the BBC, based on Winston Churchill's A History of the English-Speaking Peoples. They were first broadcast on BBC1 in 1974 and 1975. It was produced to mark the centenary of Churchill's birth.

The series was considered misconceived for multiple reasons, such as the studio-bound production which offered little in the way of realism and the lack of available funding. Each episode dealt with a particular period in British history, and the quality was consequently variable. Much of the acting was criticised, despite the involvement of Richard Johnson, Robert Hardy, Alan Howard, Colin Blakely, Anna Massey, Gemma Jones, and Edward Fox, amongst others.  The series was reviewed at some length in the programme TV Hell, which revealed that viewing figures had plummeted from 2 million at the series' launch to less than half a million by the fifth episode. The programme was swiftly buried in a later time-slot for the remainder of its run.

Nancy Banks-Smith in The Guardian described it as having "little to offer us but blood, horsehair and history. Though a hell of a lot of each."

References

External links
 
 TV Cream on Churchill's People

Winston Churchill
BBC television dramas
1970s British drama television series
1974 British television series debuts
1975 British television series endings
English-language television shows